The Boșorog (in its upper course also: Gropșoara) is a left tributary of the Râul Mare in Romania. Its source is located in the Șureanu Mountains. It flows into the Râul Mare upstream from the Canciu dam.

References

Rivers of Romania
Rivers of Alba County